Meredith McGrath was the defending champion but did not compete that year.

Brenda Schultz won in the final 6–1, 6–2 against Elena Likhovtseva.

Seeds
A champion seed is indicated in bold text while text in italics indicates the round in which that seed was eliminated.

  Brenda Schultz (champion)
  Amy Frazier (semifinals)
 n/a
  Amanda Coetzer (first round)
  Lisa Raymond (quarterfinals)
  Nicole Bradtke (second round)
  Tami Whitlinger-Jones (quarterfinals)
  Patty Fendick (semifinals)
  Elena Likhovtseva (final)

Draw

External links
 1995 IGA Classic Draw

1994 Singles
1995 WTA Tour